Brahelinna (also known as the Brahe Castle) is a castle ruin in Ristiina, located in the southern part of Mikkeli in South Savonia, Finland. It was founded by Count Per Brahe the Younger.

See also
List of castles in Finland
 Kajaani Castle
 Oulu Castle

References

Castles in Finland
Ruins in Finland
History of South Savo
Mikkeli